The 2010–11 Slovenian Football Cup was the 20th season of the Slovenian Football Cup, Slovenia's football knockout competition. Maribor were the defending champions, having won their sixth Slovenian Cup the previous season.

Qualified clubs

2009–10 Slovenian PrvaLiga members
Celje
Domžale
Drava Ptuj
Gorica
Interblock
Koper
Maribor
Nafta Lendava
Olimpija
Rudar Velenje

Qualified through MNZ Regional Cups
Winners and runners-up of the regional MNZ cups.
MNZ Ljubljana:  Krka, Dob
MNZ Maribor: Dogoše, Malečnik
MNZ Celje: Dravinja, Krško
MNZ Koper: Postojna, Ankaran
MNZ Nova Gorica: Primorje, Brda
MNZ Murska Sobota: Mura 05, Tromejnik
MNZ Lendava: Hotiza, Bistrica
MNZG-Kranj: Triglav Kranj, Šenčur
MNZ Ptuj: Aluminij, Zavrč

First round
These matches took place on 24 and 25 August 2010.

Second round
Gorica, Koper, Maribor and Olimpija received byes to this round. These matches took place on 14, 15 and 29 September 2010.

Quarter-finals
The first legs took place on 20 October 2010 and the second legs took place on 27 October and 3 November 2010.

First legs

Second legs

Semi-finals
The four winners from the previous round competed in this round. The first legs took place on 20 April 2011 and the second legs took place on 26 April 2011.

First legs

Second legs

Final

References

Slovenian Football Cup seasons
Cup
Slovenia